Los Apson is a former Mexican rock-n-roll band, best known for their Spanish language cover versions of famous songs.

History 
The band was formed in 1957 by Arturo Durazo, a guitarist and a rock-n-roll enthusiast, with his brother Francisco “Pancho” Durazo. Both of them had a relatively easy access to popular English hits of the time as they lived in the border town of Agua Prieta, Sonora. Originally named Los Apson Boys, they quickly shortened it to Los Apson, the band's name came from the first letters of the town, and the first three from the state. They were quickly joined by José Luis García and Tránsito Gámez along with Raúl Hernández Cota. Despite the town's preference for ranchera music, they gained a following which expanded beyond the borders of their small town.

The band was criticised for being malinchistas, by virtue of performing American rather than Mexican music.

Success 
The band gained national success, with several commercially successful singles, including covers of the Beatles' hit "And I Love Her" and the bluegrass classic "Cotton Fields".

Albums 
 1963: Llegaron Los Apson
 1963: Bailando y Cantando Con Los Apson
 1964: Atrás De La Raya
 1964: El Barba Azul
 1964: Aleluya
 1965: Satisfacción
 1965: Por Eso Estamos como Estamos!
 1965: ¡Nuevos Éxitos!
 1966: No Hay Amor
 1967: En Ritmo!
 1967: El Arado
 1969: El Compadre Vacilador

References 

Mexican rock music groups
Rock and roll music groups
Musical groups established in 1957
1957 establishments in Mexico